The 2014 Money in the Bank was the fifth annual Money in the Bank professional wrestling pay-per-view and livestreaming event produced by WWE. It took place on June 29, 2014, at the TD Garden in Boston, Massachusetts. This was the first Money in the Bank event to air on the WWE Network, which launched in February.

Eight matches took place at the event, with no match aired on the Kickoff pre-show. The titular ladder match for the Money in the Bank contract was won by Seth Rollins. The main event was a ladder match for the vacant WWE World Heavyweight Championship, which was won by John Cena. The event received 122,000 buys (excluding WWE Network views), down from the previous year's 199,000 buys.

Production

Background
Money in the Bank is an annual gimmick pay-per-view (PPV) event produced by WWE since 2010. The concept of the show comes from WWE's established Money in the Bank ladder match, in which multiple wrestlers use ladders to retrieve a briefcase hanging above the ring. The briefcase contains a contract that guarantees the winner a match for a world championship at any time within the next year. For 2014, only one Money in the Bank ladder match occurred and the winner received a contract for a WWE World Heavyweight Championship match, following the unification of the WWE Championship and World Heavyweight Championship at TLC: Tables, Ladders & Chairs in December 2013. The 2014 event was the fifth event in the Money in the Bank chronology. The event was previously held in July, but for 2014, the event was moved to June and was held on June 29, 2014, at the TD Garden in Boston, Massachusetts. In addition to traditional pay-per-view outlets, the 2014 event was the first Money in the Bank to air on the WWE Network, which launched in February.

Storylines
The card consisted of eight matches that resulted from scripted storylines, where wrestlers portrayed villains, heroes, or less distinguishable characters in scripted events that built tension and culminated in a wrestling match or series of matches. Results werepredetermined by WWE's writers, while storylines were produced on WWE's weekly television shows, Raw and SmackDown.

On the June 2 episode of Raw, Alberto Del Rio qualified for the Money in the Bank ladder match by defeating Dolph Ziggler. The following week, following Daniel Bryan being stripped of his WWE World Heavyweight Championship due to injury, Stephanie McMahon changed the match into a ladder match for the vacant title. The same night, Triple H placed Randy Orton into the match, while United States Champion Sheamus and Cesaro defeated Intercontinental Champion Bad News Barrett and Rob Van Dam respectively to qualify. On the June 13 episode of SmackDown, Bray Wyatt qualified for the match after defeating Dean Ambrose (with interference from Seth Rollins). On the June 16 episode of Raw, John Cena won a spot in the match by defeating Kane in a stretcher match, and Roman Reigns qualified for the match by winning a 19-man battle royal. On the June 23 episode of Raw, Kane was added to the match by Triple H.

During the feud between John Cena and Bray Wyatt, WWE Tag Team Champions The Usos (Jey Uso and Jimmy Uso) inserted themselves in the rivalry alongside Cena to  counteract Wyatt Family members Luke Harper and Erick Rowan. At Payback, The Usos were once again be in Cena's corner to even the odds and in the process, Cena defeated Bray Wyatt in a Last Man Standing match to end the feud. The next night on Raw, Rowan and Harper shifted their attention to The Usos, defeating the latter in a non-title tag team match on the June 2 episode of Raw. Due to this win, they earned a match for the Tag Team Championship at the pay-per-view.

On the June 17 episode of Main Event, a Money In The Bank ladder match was added to the event, with Seth Rollins declaring himself the first participant in the match. On the June 23 episode of Raw, Triple H added Intercontinental Champion Bad News Barrett, Dolph Ziggler, Rob Van Dam, Kofi Kingston, and Jack Swagger to the match. Later that night (after Dean Ambrose threatened to disrupt the pay-per-view), Rollins requested Ambrose be added to the match, to which Triple H agreed. On the June 27 episode of SmackDown, Barrett suffered an injury, causing him to be removed from the match.

At Payback, after a loss to RybAxel (Ryback and Curtis Axel), Cody Rhodes told his brother, Goldust, that he deserved a better partner than him. Following Payback, Goldust was unsuccessful in defeating RybAxel with his new partners, chosen for him by Cody. On the June 16 episode of Raw, Cody debuted as his new moniker of Stardust, and began teaming with his brother to defeat the team RybAxel. On the June 24 episode of Main Event, Rybaxel challenged Stardust and Goldust to a match at Money in the Bank, which they accepted.

On the June 17 episode of Main Event, Naomi defeated WWE Divas Champion Paige in a non-title match, setting up a title match between the two at Money In The Bank.

After Fandango had replaced his dance partner Summer Rae with Layla, Summer Rae attacked Layla on the May 19 episode of Raw. They continued to attack each other and interfere in Fandango's matches, thus setting up a match at the pay-per-view, with Fandango as the special guest referee.

Since his debut, Rusev was presented as a Russian super athlete. His manager, Lana, insulted the United States many times. This included an attack on WWE Hall of Famer Jim Duggan, known for his patriotic gimmick, who was saved by Big E. Big E and Rusev had a match at Payback, but Big E was defeated by Rusev. After the event, they continued to attack each other, setting up a rematch at Money in the Bank.

Event

Pre-show
During the Money in the Bank Kickoff pre-show, Daniel Bryan came out to speak about his health and being stripped of the WWE World Heavyweight Championship. The former champion led the Boston fans in an echoing "Yes!" chant and said that his recovery was going poorly and that he didn't know when he'd be back. He promised to return better than ever and to win back his title. Bo Dallas entered the ring to try to cheer Bryan up. Bryan called Dallas a "Bo-ner" then mocked his "Bo-lieve" catchphrase, telling him "Bo-leave" before leading another round of chants.

Preliminary matches
The actual pay-per-view opened with The Usos defending the WWE Tag Team Championship against The Wyatt Family's Luke Harper and Erick Rowan. In the end, Jimmy and Jey executed a double Superplex on Rowan. Jey performed a Samoan Splash on Rowan, which was followed by Jimmy performing a Samoan Splash on Rowan to retain the titles.

Next, Paige defended the WWE Divas Championship against Naomi. The match ended when Paige executed a RamPaige on Naomi to retain the title.

After that, Damien Sandow took on Adam Rose. Rose performed a Party Foul on Sandow to win the match.

The next match was the WWE World Heavyweight Championship contract Money in the Bank ladder match involving Kofi Kingston, Jack Swagger, Rob Van Dam, Dolph Ziggler, Dean Ambrose and Seth Rollins. During the match, Ambrose pushed a ladder, causing Kingston to fall off the top rope onto Swagger, Ziggler and Van Dam. Van Dam executed a Rolling Thunder Senton on Rollins, who was lay on a ladder wedged in the ring corner. Swagger performed a Powerbomb off a ladder on Van Dam, which was followed by Ambrose performing a Suplex off the ladder on Rollins. Ambrose injured his shoulder, leading to him being taken backstage by medical personnel. Kingston performed a Back Body Drop on Rollins atop a ladder, causing Rollins to fall onto another ladder bridged between the ladder and the ropes. Ziggler executed a Zig Zag onto a ladder on Kingston. Ziggler attempted to retrieve the briefcase but Rollins hit Ziggler with a chair. Rollins attempted to retrieve the briefcase but Ambrose came back out and hit Rollins with the chair. Ambrose attempted to retrieve the briefcase but Kane came down to the ring and executed a Chokeslam and a Tombstone Piledriver on Ambrose. Rollins retrieved the briefcase to win the match.

Next, Gold and Stardust faced Ryback and Curtis Axel. In the end, Stardust pinned Ryback with a roll-up to win the match.

After that, Rusev wrestled Big E. Rusev forced Big E to submit to The Accolade to win the match.

In the penultimate match, Summer Rae faced Layla with Fandango as the special guest referee. Layla performed a Roundhouse Kick on Rae to win the match.

Main event
The main event was a ladder match for the vacant WWE World Heavyweight Championship involving Alberto Del Rio, Bray Wyatt, Cesaro, John Cena, Kane, Randy Orton, Roman Reigns, and United States Champion Sheamus. During the match, Cesaro and Sheamus fought atop the ladder but Wyatt pushed the ladder, causing Cesaro and Sheamus to hang onto the championship belts. Orton executed an Elevated DDT off a ladder bridged between the apron and a broadcast table on Sheamus. After everyone fought each other off, Sheamus controlled the match by performing a Diving Shoulder Block on Kane, an Irish Curse Backbreaker on Del Rio, White Noise on Orton and a Brogue Kick on Cena. After Orton and Kane removed the other participants from the ring, Reigns controlled the match by performing a Spear on Kane, Superman Punches on Orton and Sheamus, Running Front Dropkicks on Del Rio, who was draped on the bottom rope, and Wyatt, who was draped on a broadcast table, and a Spear on Cesaro. Reigns fought with Cena, ending by executing a Spear on Cena. After each men executed their finishers on the other participants, Reigns fought with Orton and attempted to retrieve the championship belts but Kane performed a Chokeslam on Reigns. Orton attempted to retrieve the championship belts but Cena executed an Attitude Adjustment on Kane and an Attitude Adjustment on Orton onto Kane. After that Cena retrieved the championship belts to win the match.

Reception
The event received generally positive reviews. James Caldwell of Pro Wrestling Torch described the Money in the Bank Ladder match as an "excellent MITB ladder match that had a little bit of everything", focusing in the Ambrose-Rollins feud and gave it 4.25 stars out of 5. Also, he compared the Money in the Bank match and the WWE World Heavyweight Championship ladder match and said that "not as good as the similar MITB ladder match, as there were too many wrestlers in the match, the middle really dragged, and this felt more disorganized and cluttered than the nicely-structured previous match." Caldwell felt it was the "right decision for Cena to win" to set up his match with Brock Lesnar at SummerSlam in two months. He gave the main event 3 stars out of 5.

PWInsider Dave Scherer criticized the decision to crown John Cena as champion. According to him, he "hated the result" and "it's the wrong decision and I think the crowd was very representative of how many fans felt tonight as they cheered for a lot of new talent and groaned at a lot of the older talent". Also, he liked the opener, the Money in the Bank ladder match and the Rusev vs. Big E match.

Dave Meltzer of the Wrestling Observer Newsletter gave the Money in the Bank ladder match 4.5 stars out of 5 while the WWE World Heavyweight Championship ladder match was given 4  stars out of 5.

Aftermath
Randy Orton received medical assistance after the event. He received 11 staples to close the gash in his head suffered during the main event of Money in the Bank.

The following night on Raw, The Authority held a mock celebration for the new WWE World Heavyweight Champion John Cena and revealed he would be featured on the cover of the WWE 2K15 video game, but Cena made it clear that he would not allow The Authority to control him. Triple H then scheduled a fatal four-way match for the WWE World Heavyweight Championship at Battleground between Cena, Orton, Kane, and Reigns. In a tag team match between those four superstars later in the night, Seth Rollins attempted to cash in his briefcase against an assaulted Cena for his championship, but was stopped by Dean Ambrose, who earlier in the show declared that he would be there to stop Rollins from cashing in his briefcase successfully.

Also on Raw, AJ Lee returned and defeated Paige for the Divas Championship. A rematch between the two for the title was later scheduled for Battleground.

Bad News Barrett, who had been removed from the Money in the Bank ladder match due to injury, was also stripped of his Intercontinental Championship. A battle royal for the vacant championship, scheduled for Battleground, was won by The Miz.

Brock Lesnar returned on July 21 and proceeded to defeat Cena at SummerSlam to capture the WWE World Heavyweight Championship. At WrestleMania 31, on March 29, 2015, Seth Rollins successfully cashed in his Money in the Bank contract during Lesnar and Royal Rumble winner Roman Reigns' match, making it into a triple threat match, which Rollins won by pinning Reigns to win the WWE World Heavyweight Championship. However, Rollins vacated the title on November 4, 2015, after suffering multiple knee injuries at a live event in Dublin, Ireland, ending his reign at 220 days.

Results

References

External links
 Official website

2014
Events in Boston
Entertainment events in Boston
2014 in Boston
2014 WWE Network events
Professional wrestling in Boston
2014 WWE pay-per-view events
June 2014 events in the United States